Silberhorn is a German language surname. Notable people with the name include:
 Christine Silberhorn (1974), German physicist
 Thomas Silberhorn (1968), German lawyer and politician

References 

German-language surnames
Surnames of Bavarian origin